Franz Xaver Schwarz (27 November 1875 – 2 December 1947) was a high ranking German Nazi Party official who served as Reichsschatzmeister (National Treasurer) of the Party throughout most of its existence. He was also one of the highest ranking members of the Schutzstaffel (SS).

Early life
Schwarz was born in Günzburg, the seventh of eight children born to a master baker and his wife.  He was educated up to a high school level at the Günzburger vocational training school. Schwarz married Berta Breher on 26 August 1899. From 1900 to 1924, except for the war years of 1914 to 1918, he worked as an "administrative official" in the city government of Munich. During World War I, Schwarz served as a warrant officer (Feldwebelleutnant) in the Imperial German Army. He served briefly as a platoon leader but due to gastric troubles which afflicted him for his entire life he was spared field duty beginning in January 1916. He was discharged from active service at the end of the war, given a 30 percent war disability pension, put into the reserves and commissioned a Leutnant in 1920. Schwarz went to work in an administrative capacity in the Munich City Council. In 1919 Schwarz joined the Deutschvölkischer Schutz- und Trutzbund, the largest and most influential anti-semitic organization in the Weimar Republic.

Nazi Party career
Schwarz joined the Nazi Party in 1922 and participated in the failed Beer Hall Putsch of November 1923. When the Party was banned by the German government, Schwarz joined the Greater German People's Community, a Nazi front organization based in Munich. He served as the Treasurer of its governing board from 9 July 1924 until it was disbanded. 

With the re-establishment of the Nazi Party on 27 February 1925, Schwarz immediately rejoined and became party member number six. He left his job as an accountant at the Munich City Hall to become the full-time Treasurer of the Nazi Party on 21 March 1925. He rebuilt the financial and administrative functions of the party. It was Schwarz who raised the money for the publication of Adolf Hitler's book, Mein Kampf. In April–May 1930 Schwarz negotiated the purchase of the party headquarters, the Brown House at 45 Brienner Straße in Munich. From December 1929 to October 1934, Schwarz was a City Councilor in Munich. From 16 September 1931 forward, Hitler granted Schwarz plenipotentiary powers over all financial matters of the Nazi Party. 

After the Nazi seizure of power, Schwarz was elected to the Reichstag in March 1933, from electoral constituency 26, Franconia, and served until the fall of the Nazi regime. On 2 June 1933, he was also named a Reichsleiter (Reich Leader), the second highest political rank of the Nazi Party. On 2 October 1933, Schwarz was made a member of the Academy for German Law at its inaugural meeting. Hitler attended Schwarz's 60th birthday celebration on 27 November 1935. Hitler's will, dated 2 May 1938 (which left his entire fortune to the party) included the provision that it be opened in Schwarz's presence.

Besides the party treasury (largely based on membership dues), Schwarz was responsible for the central assignment of NSDAP unique membership numbers. When members died or stopped paying dues, the old numbers were not freed up for new members. If old members picked up their dues later a new party number would be assigned. The Nazi Party had 8.5 million members on the books by 1945. Schwarz was regarded as an able administrator who generally kept out of party politics.

SA and SS membership

On 18 December 1931, Schwarz was made a Gruppenführer in the Sturmabteilung (SA), the Nazi paramilitary organization. In June 1932, Schwarz joined the Schutzstaffel, also as a Gruppenführer, with SS member number 38,500. On 1 July 1933 he was promoted to SS-Obergruppenführer. On 9 November 1933 his SA rank was raised to Obergruppenführer as well. Finally, on 20 April 1942, he was promoted to the newly created rank of SS-Oberst-Gruppenführer, becoming one of only four people to ever hold the rank. 

On 5 June 1944, Schwarz received a high military award, the War Merit Cross, 1st class with Swords (Kriegsverdienstkreuz 1. Klasse mit Schwertern) by Hitler for his work during the Munich air raids of 24–25 April of that year. Further, Schwarz led a Volkssturm battalion in Grünwald at the end of the war. He was arrested by the Americans and interned at Camp Ashcan.

Death
Schwarz died in another Allied internment camp near Regensburg on 2 December 1947, due to recurring gastric troubles. He was 72. In September 1948, Schwarz was posthumously classified by the Munich denazification court as a "major offender" and all his assets were confiscated.

See also
List of SS-Oberst-Gruppenführer

Notes

References
 
 Hallgarten, George W. F. (1952). "Adolf Hitler and German Heavy Industry, 1931-1933", The Journal of Economic History.
 
 
 Orlow, Dietrich (1973). The History of the Nazi Party: 1933-1945. University of Pittsburgh Press.
 Weinberg, Gerhard L. (1955). "Hitler's Private Testament of May 2, 1938", The Journal of Modern History.

External links

Picture and an article 
 
 

1875 births
1947 deaths
Deaths from digestive disease
German Army personnel of World War I
German prisoners of war in World War II held by the United States
Greater German People's Community politicians
Members of the Academy for German Law
Members of the Reichstag of Nazi Germany
Military personnel of Bavaria
Nazi Party officials
Nazi Party politicians
Nazis who participated in the Beer Hall Putsch
Officials of Nazi Germany
People from Günzburg
People from the Kingdom of Bavaria
Reichsleiters
SS-Oberst-Gruppenführer
Sturmabteilung officers
Volkssturm personnel
Prisoners who died in United States military detention
Nazis who died in prison custody